Rocío Banquells is the 1st studio album by Mexican pop singer Rocío Banquells. This album was released on 1985.

History
The album debut of the great Mexican singer Rocío Banquells. The album includes songs as Este hombre no se toca, Luna Mágica and Abrázame. The album is considered one of the classics of the Spanish-Language music of the 1980s.  The majority of the records was written and produced by famous Di Felisatti & J.R. Florez group.

Track listing
Tracks:
 Este hombre no se toca
 Abrázame
 No moriré por tí
 Habría que inventarte
 Amantes
 Ocrilú
 Como se cambia
 Luna mágica
 Ayudame
 Quien me roba el corazón

Singles
 Este hombre no se toca
 Abrázame
 Luna mágica

Covers
 Singer María José covered the song "Este hombre no se toca" for her 2009 album Amante de lo ajeno.

Reference list

1985 albums